Toabur Rahim was an Awami League politician and the former member of parliament of Sylhet-14.

Career
Rahim was elected to parliament from Sylhet-14 as an Awami League candidate in 1973.

Death
Rahim died on 31 December 2020, in London, United Kingdom, after catching COVID-19.

References

Awami League politicians
2021 deaths
1st Jatiya Sangsad members
Deaths from the COVID-19 pandemic in England